Kepler 186b (also known as KOI-571.03) is an exoplanet located around 582 light-years away from Earth. Kepler-186b is orbiting a red dwarf known as Kepler-186, named after the space telescope that found it.

Kepler-186b is the innermost planet of its system, and thus not suitable for life. One year on the planet is only 3.884 days long due to its location near the parent star.

It is tidally locked. As a result, one hemisphere is in eternal daylight while the other hemisphere is in endless darkness.
 
The other planets in the system are Kepler-186c, d, e, and f, of which only Kepler-186f is habitable.

References

Transiting exoplanets
Exoplanets discovered in 2014
Kepler-186
186b

Cygnus (constellation)